Ioana Ducu (born 18 April 1996) is a former Romanian tennis player. In her career, she won one doubles title on the ITF Women's Circuit and reached best WTA rankings of 830 in singles and 736 in doubles.

In June 2014, together with fellow Romanian Ioana Loredana Roșca, Ducu won the girls' doubles tournament at the French Open, defeating CiCi Bellis and Markéta Vondroušová in the final, in three sets.

In 2017, it was announced that she ended her tennis career for pursuit of a career in medicine. She played her last match on the ITF Circuit in September 2014 in Sharm El Sheikh, Egypt.

ITF finals

Singles (0–1)

Doubles (1–3)

Junior Grand Slam finals

Girls' doubles

References

External links

 
 

1996 births
Living people
Tennis players from Bucharest
Romanian female tennis players
French Open junior champions
Grand Slam (tennis) champions in girls' doubles
Tennis players at the 2014 Summer Youth Olympics